The West Lothian question, also known as the English question, is a political issue in the United Kingdom. It concerns the question of whether MPs from Northern Ireland, Scotland and Wales who sit in the House of Commons should be able to vote on matters that affect only England, while MPs from England are unable to vote on matters that have been devolved to the Northern Ireland Assembly, the Scottish Parliament and the Senedd (Welsh Parliament). The term West Lothian question was coined by Enoch Powell MP in 1977 after Tam Dalyell, the Labour MP for the Scottish constituency of West Lothian, raised the matter repeatedly in House of Commons debates on devolution.

In 2011 the UK Government set up the Commission on the consequences of devolution for the House of Commons, chaired by Sir William McKay, former Clerk of the House of Commons, to examine the question. The commission published a report in 2013 which proposed various procedural changes, including the recommendation that legislation which affects only England should require the support of a majority of MPs representing English constituencies. This recommendation was known as English votes for English laws. Following the election of a Conservative majority government in the 2015 general election, new parliamentary procedures and a Legislative Grand Committee were enacted to bring it into effect. The measures were subsequently abolished in 2021.

Background
The equivalent question was raised by the opponents of Irish Home Rule in defeating William Gladstone's first (1886) and second (1893) home rule bills. Basil Williams enumerated four schemes which Gladstone proposed at various stages:
 Total exclusion of Irish members. 
 Inclusion of Irish members, in reduced numbers, for all purposes. 
 Inclusion of Irish members, in their full numbers, for certain specified purposes — the "In and Out" clause. 
 Inclusion of Irish members, in their full numbers, for all purposes — the Omnes Omnia (all people) clause.

The "West Lothian question" itself was first posed in 1977 during a British House of Commons debate about Scottish and Welsh devolution proposals. In the 14 November sitting, Tam Dalyell, the Labour MP for the Scottish constituency of West Lothian, asked,
For how long will English constituencies and English Honourable members tolerate ... at least 119 Honourable Members from Scotland, Wales and Northern Ireland exercising an important, and probably often decisive, effect on English politics while they themselves have no say in the same matters in Scotland, Wales and Northern Ireland?

To illustrate his point, Dalyell chose the example of a member of Parliament for West Lothian who could vote on matters affecting the English town of Blackburn, Lancashire, but not on matters concerning Blackburn, West Lothian in his own constituency. The name "West Lothian question" was later coined by the Ulster Unionist MP Enoch Powell in a response to Dalyell's speech, when he said "We have finally grasped what the Honourable Member for West Lothian is getting at. Let us call it the West Lothian question." The question is more commonly assumed to refer to the anomaly that came into being in 1999, with Scottish, Welsh and Northern Ireland members at Westminster allowed to vote upon English matters, but MPs for English constituencies having no influence on affairs which were devolved to Scotland, Wales or Northern Ireland. Dalyell was a vocal opponent of Scottish devolution in the 1979 and 1997 plebiscites. A devolved Scottish Parliament was created in 1999 after a clear majority voted in favour of devolution in the second referendum.

Legal status
The Scottish Parliament was formed by statute, the Scotland Act 1998, and is thus a creation of Westminster. No sovereign status on the Scottish Parliament is conferred, and the act has not changed the status of the Westminster Parliament as the supreme legislature of Scotland, with Westminster retaining the ability to override, or veto, any decisions taken by the Scottish Parliament. The Westminster Parliament remains the sovereign body; powers are devolved rather than transferred to the Scottish Parliament. The ability of all Westminster MPs to vote on Scottish legislation has not been legally diminished by devolution, as made clear by Section 28(7) of the Scotland Act 1998, which states that the legislative powers of the Scottish Parliament do "not affect the power of the Parliament of the United Kingdom to make laws for Scotland".

Legislation relating to reserved issues such as defence, national security, foreign policy and monetary and economic issues are voted on by all the MPs at Westminster to ensure consistency across the whole of the United Kingdom. The Scottish Parliament is not able to pass laws on these issues itself, as they were not devolved. The West Lothian question is not involved in this situation, as all parts of the Union have a say roughly proportional to their population and all are equally affected.

During devolution, a convention was created to manage the power of Westminster to legislate on matters within the legislative competence of the Scottish Parliament. This is known as the Sewel Convention, and the related Scottish parliamentary motions are now known as legislative consent motions (previously Sewel motions). These motions (of which there are around a dozen per year) allow MPs to vote on issues which, among other things, are within the Scottish Parliament's legislative competence. The Sewel Convention states that the Westminster Parliament will not normally legislate on devolved matters in Scotland without first obtaining the consent of the Scottish Parliament.

English votes for English laws (EVEL)

During the 2000s a number of pieces of legislation which affected only or mainly England were passed by the UK Parliament, although the votes cast by MPs were such that the legislation would not have been passed if only the votes cast by MPs representing English constituencies had been counted. The opposition Conservative Party commissioned a report, "Devolution, The West Lothian Question and the Future of the Union", which proposed some procedural changes restricting the participation of MPs representing non-English constituencies during the passage of bills relating only to England.

While the Conservatives were in government from 2010 to 2015 in coalition with the Liberal Democrats, they set up the McKay Commission to look into the question. The Commission proposed that bills in the House of Commons which affected England solely or differently should require a majority vote of MPs representing English constituencies. The Conservative manifesto for the 2015 general election included a proposal that England-only legislation should require approval from a Legislative Grand Committee prior to its Third Reading in the House of Commons. Having won a majority in that election, the Conservative government used a change in standing orders in October 2015 to give MPs representing English (or English and Welsh) constituencies a "veto" over laws affecting only England (or only England and Wales). Thus, a new law could no longer be imposed only on England by a majority of all MPs if a majority of English MPs were opposed. However, a proposed new law could still be vetoed by a majority of all MPs even if a majority of English MPs were in favour.

The measures were abolished in 2021, with the government saying that they had "added complexity and delay to the legislative process" and that their removal would allow all MPs to be represented equally.

Other possible answers to the question

English devolution

English parliament or assembly
The creation of a devolved English parliament or assembly, with full legislative powers, akin to the Scottish Parliament is seen by some as a solution to this problem, with full legislative powers also being conferred on the existing Welsh Parliament. The Westminster (United Kingdom) Parliament would continue to meet and legislate on matters of UK-wide competence such as Defence, Foreign Affairs and economic matters with the parliaments of England, Wales, Scotland and Northern Ireland legislating locally. In the early-20th-century context of Irish home rule, the equivalent option was dubbed Home Rule All Round.

Lord Falconer, the former Secretary of State for Constitutional Affairs, has stated that he believes that an English Parliament would "dwarf all other institutions." Peter Hain, who campaigned for a Welsh Assembly, warned that creating an English parliament or trying to stop Scottish and Welsh MPs from voting on England-only matters would break up the Union. Chuka Umunna suggested in July 2015 that the Labour Party should support the creation of a separate English parliament, as part of a federal United Kingdom.

Regional assemblies
The Labour government of Tony Blair attempted to address part of the West Lothian question by introducing English regional assemblies with no legislative powers. Originally, it was planned that these would be directly elected. The London Assembly was the first of these, established following a referendum in 1998, in which public and media attention was focused principally on the post of Mayor of London. Ken Livingstone was the first directly elected mayor of London. He started his victory speech with "As I was saying before I was so rudely interrupted 14 years ago", making it clear he saw the London Assembly as a recreation of a similar London wide authority to that of the Greater London Council, which he had led before it was abolished in the 1980s.

Further progress was thwarted when a referendum in the North East rejected the proposal for an elected assembly in November 2004 leading to the shelving of similar proposals for other English regions. The Regional Development Agencies were all scrapped by March 2012 with their powers and functions being transferred either to local government or in the case of London, the Greater London Authority.

Increased powers to English counties and cities
Douglas Carswell and Daniel Hannan have proposed that all the powers currently devolved to the Scottish Parliament should also be devolved to the English counties and cities. This would mean that the situation of Scottish MPs voting on policy which only affected England would no longer arise, because parliament would no longer be responsible for areas of policy which affected only England. Therefore, parliament would have to choose to make policy either for the United Kingdom as a whole, or not at all.
Carswell and Hannan write: "All the fields of policy currently within the purview of the Holyrood Parliament should be transferred to English counties and cities (thereby, incidentally, answering the west Lothian Question)."

Dissolution of the Union
Another solution might be the dissolution of the United Kingdom leading to some or all of the countries of the United Kingdom (England, Northern Ireland, Scotland, and Wales) becoming independent sovereign states. The Scottish National Party (SNP), which campaigns for Scottish independence, won an outright majority in the Scottish Parliament in the 2011 Scottish election. A referendum was held on 18 September 2014, with voters rejecting independence by 55% to 45%. In Wales, Welsh Nationalist party Plaid Cymru holds Welsh independence as a long-term aim, while Propel, formerly the Welsh National Party, more aggressively campaigns for independence. In Northern Ireland there are no mainstream political parties calling for an independent Northern Irish state, but parties calling for a united Ireland include Sinn Féin and the Social Democratic and Labour Party (SDLP).

Reducing the number of Scottish MPs

During the existence of the Parliament of Northern Ireland (1921–1972), the number of MPs elected from Northern Ireland to Westminster was below the standard ratio of MPs compared with the rest of the UK. During periods when the predominantly unionist MPs from Northern Ireland deprived Labour of working majorities, Conservatives supported the principle that "every member of the House of Commons is equal to every other member of the House of Commons". Scotland traditionally enjoyed a greater number of MPs per head of population than the rest of the UK, but this advantage was reduced significantly at the 2005 UK general election. An argument against the idea of having a lower number of MPs, in return for more devolved powers, is that if the national parliament takes important decisions (such as waging war) then people should be fully represented.

See also

 Asymmetric federalism
 Barnett formula
 Britishness
 Campaign for an English Parliament
 Cornish self-government movement
 Democratic deficit
 Devolved English parliament
 English nationalism
 Federalism in the United Kingdom
 History of Scottish devolution
 Parliament of England
 Proportional representation
 Scottish mafia
 Sewel Convention
 Welsh nationalism

References

Further reading
Devolution: the end of Britain?, Tam Dalyell, Jonathan Cape, London, 1977
Devolution in Britain Today, Russell Deacon, Manchester University Press, 2006
Report on devolution and the governance of England, House of Commons Justice Committee, 24 May 2009
A Stronger or Weaker Union? Public Reactions to Asymmetric Devolution in the United Kingdom, Professor John Curtice, University of Strathclyde, Publius – the journal of federalism, Volume 36, Number 1, Winter 2006, Oxford University Press (PDF file)
The West Lothian Question, Oonagh Gay, House of Commons Library SN/PC/2586, 26 June 2006 (PDF file)
 N. Lloyd-Jones, "United Kingdom: four nations or one?", "History Today" (February 2015)

External links
Commission on the consequences of devolution for the House of Commons
House of Commons Scotland Bill Debate, 14 November 1977
Talking Politics: The West Lothian Question, BBC News Online, 1 June 1998
Hansard text of a debate on the subject in 1998 (scroll down for the start, and continue on to subsequent pages)
McKay Commission Report: Report of the Commission on the Consequences of Devolution for the House of Commons
Statement by the Prime Minister on the Scottish Independence Referendum
UK Parliament: English votes for English laws: House of Commons bill procedure

English nationalism
Government of the United Kingdom
House of Commons of the United Kingdom
Politics of England
Politics of Northern Ireland
Politics of Scotland
Politics of Wales
Constitution of the United Kingdom
British Royal Commissions
Devolution in the United Kingdom
National questions